Jules Lowie (6 October 1913 – 2 August 1960) was a Belgian racing cyclist. His major win was Paris–Nice in 1938.

A native of the East Flanders town of Nokere, Jules Lowie died in Deinze two months short of his 47th birthday.

Palmarès 

 Gent–Wevelgem – 7th (1945)
 Flèche Wallonne
 4th (1944)
 8th (1943)
 10th (1945)
 Paris–Roubaix – 2nd (1943)
 Tour of Flanders
 5th (1942)
 7th (1935-1938-1941)
 Paris–Nice (1938)
 10th (1946)
 Paris-St. Etienne – 1 stage (1938)
 Tour de France – 5th
 Paris–Tours – 9th (1935)

External link

Belgian male cyclists
1913 births
1960 deaths
Cyclists from East Flanders
People from Kruisem
20th-century Belgian people